Albert John "Harrison" Owen (24 June 1890 – 30 May 1966) was an Australian playwright, novelist, poet, and journalist.

Career
Owen became a prolific contributor of poetry and local news articles to The Bulletin from 1912 to 1919. From the basis of his earlier work, the chief of editing for the Melbourne Herald J. E. Davidson appointed him as the newspaper's drama critic and author of the Peerybingle Papers, a regular mixture of light verse and prose. Soon afterwards he took over its Under the Clocks column.

Although Owen spent most of his life as a daily journalist, his creative flair was never jeopardized. Throughout his life he published most of his poetic writings and stories. His first novel The Mount Marunga Mystery was published in 1919. He released a collective of his satirical and verse poetry from The Bulletin in 1923, entitled Tommyrot Rhymes for Children and Grown-ups who Ought to Know Better.

With many of his Bulletin workmates, Owen co-founded the now defunct Australian Authors' and Writers' Guild in 1915.

From 1920, Owen moved to London and worked as a freelance journalist. From 1921 to 1932 he worked as a leader-writer for the Daily Sketch and also produced a weekly feature for John Bull until 1940. In this period he was active as a dramatist. The first of his three plays to be performed in London, The Gentleman in Waiting (1925) arrived with a mixed response—reviews varied from 'witty' and 'diverting' to 'prolix' and 'banal', with a general consensus that the piece was over-literary. His second play, The Happy Husband (1927), with Charles Laughton and Madge Titheradge was very successful and subsequently toured to New York, Paris and Vienna. In 1931, the play was filmed as Uneasy Virtue. Owen's next play, Doctor Pygmalion (1932), with Ronald Squire and Gladys Cooper, was also a success and productions in Melbourne, Sydney and Amsterdam followed its London season. In 1940 Owen published The Playwright's Craft.

Owen returned to Melbourne in 1940. His regular reviews for the Melbourne Herald reflected both his passion for the theatre and his intimate knowledge of its workings. He became a leader-writer for The Sun News-Pictorial and wrote a Saturday column, Merely my Prejudice. At first a witty, anecdotal reflection on human foibles, it came increasingly to express his delight in the uses and abuses of the English language and the depth and diversity of his literary interests. The name of the column, with its nice mixture of diffidence and self-assertion, anticipated the tone, and reflected the writer. Nettie Palmer had written in 1928: 'There was always a curious modesty about Harrison Owen … “I'm just a young man from Geelong”, he used to say'.

He retired in 1955, although he published in the Melbourne Herald in 1957 a series of articles, Down Memory Lane. Predeceased by his wife, and childless, Owen died of Cerebrovascular disease at St Kilda East on 30 May 1966 and was cremated.

External links

Australian Dictionary of Biographies - Harrison Owen

1890 births
Australian male dramatists and playwrights
Australian male novelists
Australian male short story writers
Writers from Victoria (Australia)
1966 deaths
20th-century Australian novelists
20th-century Australian dramatists and playwrights
20th-century Australian short story writers
20th-century Australian male writers
People from Geelong